Southwood is a residential neighbourhood in the southwest quadrant of Calgary, Alberta. It is bounded by 98th Avenue (an alley north of Southland Drive) to the north, Macleod Trail to the east, Anderson Road to the south and 14th Street SW to the west. Southland Drive passes through the northern part of the community.  A major roadway, Elbow Drive, bisects the community.

The community is served by the Southland and Anderson stations of the C-Train LRT system. Southcentre Mall is located east from the neighbourhood.

Southwood was established in 1960. It is represented in the Calgary City Council by the Ward 11 councillor.

Demographics

Residents in this community had a median household income of $51,409 in 2000, and there were 14% low income residents living in the neighbourhood. As of 2000, 18.8% of the residents were immigrants. A proportion of 21% of the buildings were condominiums or apartments, and 42.4% of the housing was used for renting.

Education
The community is served by the Ethel M. Johnson Elementary, Harold Panabaker Junior High and Foundations For the Future Elementary public schools, as well as St. Stephen Elementary & Junior High (Catholic).  The Southwood branch of the Calgary Public Library is located near the intersection of Southland Drive and Elbow Drive.

Business
Commercial development in the neighbourhood includes the Southland Park complex along Macleod Trail and the Southwood Corner mini mall at the intersection of Southland Drive and Elbow Drive.  The community has three gasoline filling stations (with attached convenience stores), a Tim Hortons, Humpty's restaurant, several fast food outlets, two liquor stores, a Bentley's Pub, two dental offices, a No Frills grocery store, Planet Organic market, Dollarama, Southwood Automotive car repair, a car wash and a dog wash.  In the 1960s and 1970s Southwood was home to the Corral Drive-in movie theatre.  The drive-in closed to make way for Calgary Transit's Anderson Station shops and garage.

Transit
In addition to the C-train, several bus routes run through Southwood.  Most run along Southland Drive from other communities with the purpose of allowing passengers to transfer from a bus to the C-train at Southland Station. Route 3 (Elbow Drive / Sandstone), which travels along Elbow Drive, in both North and South directions, does not stop at either C-train station in Southwood.  Passengers wishing to transfer from Bus #3 to the C-train must do so at Heritage Station in the community of Haysboro.

See also
List of neighbourhoods in Calgary

References

External links
Southwood Community Association

Neighbourhoods in Calgary